KF Tirana is an Albanian professional football club based in Tiranë. The club was founded as the Agimi Sports Association in 1920. The club was renamed to Sportklub Tiranë in 1927 and has since been called 17 Nëntori, and Puna Tirana before being renamed to its current KF Tirana in 1991. The club has won a total of 49 major domestic trophies, including a record 24 league championships, the Albanian Cup 15 times and the Albanian Supercup 10 times. The club has never been relegated from the Albanian Superliga, meaning they have been the only ever present team in Albanian top flight history.

KF Tirana seasons

 Results from 1939, 1940 & 1942 Superliga seasons are not added in the total line.

 
Tirana